Elizete Gomes da Silva (2 May 1971 – 22 September 2017) was a Brazilian athlete who competed in the heptathlon. She won multiple medals on the regional level. She retired from competition in 2009.

Da Silva, along with her sister and two others, died in a traffic collision near Londrina on 22 September 2017. She was 46 years old.

Competition record

Personal bests
200 metres – 24.69 (-0.6 m/s) (Rio de Janeiro 2007)
800 metres – 2:17.22 (Rio de Janeiro 2000)
100 metres hurdles – 14.35 (+0.3 m/s) (Rio de Janeiro 2007)
High jump – 1.74 (Rio de Janeiro 2001)
Long jump – 6.06 (+1.3 (São Caetano do Sul 2001)
Shot put – 12.98 (Rio de Janeiro 2007)
Javelin throw – 44.76 (Tunja 2006)
Heptathlon – 5766 (São Paulo 2007)

References

1971 births
2017 deaths
Brazilian heptathletes
Athletes (track and field) at the 2007 Pan American Games
Pan American Games athletes for Brazil
Road incident deaths in Brazil